Howard Township is a township in Gentry County, in the U.S. state of Missouri.

Howard Township bears the name of local pioneers Asa and Samuel Howard.

References

Townships in Missouri
Townships in Gentry County, Missouri